Evelyn Merchant (August 25, 1913 – April 2, 1995), known professionally as Harlene Wood (also Harley Wood, Jill Martin, Jill Jackson,  and Jill Jackson-Miller) was an American film actress, composer, writer and author. She appeared in 20 films between 1935 and 1953.

Film actress

Wood entered show business as a radio actress before entering films in 1934. She appeared in approximately 20 films, playing small bit roles. Modern viewers will recognize her work in three 1937 Three Stooges films, Dizzy Doctors, Back to the Woods and Cash and Carry.

Songwriter

In addition to her film work, Wood composed the song "Let There Be Peace on Earth" (1955) under the name "Jill Jackson-Miller," having adopted her surname from husband, songwriter Sy Miller. The song was popular enough to be used in the American Peace Crusade and earned her George Washington Honor Medal from the Freedoms Foundation. The pair also composed most of the songs for the television special. Imagine That! (1971) starring Dora Hall.

Death

Wood died on April 2, 1995, in Honokaa, Hawaii.

References

External links

1913 births
1995 deaths
American film actresses
20th-century American actresses
American radio actresses